The 2003 Pepsi 400, was a NASCAR Winston Cup Series race held on July 5, 2003, at Daytona International Speedway in Daytona Beach, Florida. Contested over 160 laps on the 2.5-mile (4.0 km) asphalt superspeedway, it was the seventeenth race of the 2003 NASCAR Winston Cup Series season. Greg Biffle of Roush Racing won the race, earning his first career Winston Cup Series win.

Background
Daytona International Speedway is a race track in Daytona Beach, Florida that is one of six superspeedways to hold NASCAR races, the others being Auto Club Speedway, Indianapolis Motor Speedway, Michigan International Speedway, Pocono Raceway and Talladega Superspeedway. The track also features two other layouts that utilize portions of the primary high speed tri-oval, such as a  sports car course and a  motorcycle course. The track's  infield includes the  Lake Lloyd, which has hosted powerboat racing. The speedway is owned and operated by International Speedway Corporation.

Race
The race is famous for one of the longest green flag runs ever. There were only two brief yellows in the first half for a total of ten laps. The final 81 laps (the entire second half) were run under green, setting up a finish where fuel strategy was going to be key to deciding the winner. Rookie Greg Biffle won the event for his first Cup Series victory. His win was an upset after Bobby Labonte ran out of gas in the final laps, likewise, Kevin Harvick led the most laps at 54, but also failed to win.

Top 10 results

References

Pepsi 400
Pepsi 400
NASCAR races at Daytona International Speedway
July 2003 sports events in the United States